"Big Stepper" is a song by American rapper Roddy Ricch. The song was released on October 11, 2019 as the lead single from Ricch's debut studio album Please Excuse Me for Being Antisocial. The song was written by Rodrick Moore, Jr., Cristian Gonzalez, Joseph Nguyen and Steven Alexander.

Music video
A music video to accompany the release of "Big Stepper" was first released onto YouTube on October 11, 2019.

Personnel
Credits adapted from Tidal.
 DJ Shawdi P – producer
 Flexico/Lil Mexico Beatz – producer
 Figurez Made It – producer
 Curtis "Sircut" Bye – assistant engineer
 Zachary Acosta – assistant engineer
 Nicolas De Porcel – masterer
 Cyrus "NOIS" Taghipour – mixer
 Derek "MixedByAli" Ali – mixer
 Nate Rodriguez - writer
 Cristian Gonzalez – writer
 Joseph Nguyen – writer
 Rodrick Moore – writer
 Steven Alexander – writer

Charts

Certifications

References

2019 singles
2019 songs
Atlantic Records singles
Roddy Ricch songs
Songs written by Roddy Ricch